The Annunciation Bridge ( - Blagoveshchensky most; from 1855 to 1918 Nikolaevsky Bridge, ; from 1918 to 2007 called Lieutenant Schmidt Bridge) is the first permanent bridge built across the Neva River in Saint Petersburg, Russia. It connects Vasilievsky Island and the central part of the city (Admiralteysky raion). The bridge's length is 331 meters and the width was 24 meters. The original name of the bridge was Nevsky Bridge. It was later renamed Blagoveshchensky Bridge. After the death of Tsar Nicholas I, it was named Nikolaevsky Bridge in his honor, and in 1918 it was renamed for Lieutenant Schmidt.

In 1727 a temporary bridge was built at the location of the modern bridge. The place was chosen by Menshikov whose palace is located at the opposite bank. This bridge, named Issakievsky, existed until the current bridge was built, at which time it was moved to the location of where Palace Bridge is located today.

The bridge was built in 1843-1850. It was designed by Stanisław Kierbedź, a Polish engineer working in Russia. The architect Alexander Brullov participated in the decoration. The design was a cast iron bridge with twin parallel swing sections at its northern end. At the time, it was the longest bridge in Europe. According to the legend, the Russian Tsar, Nicholas I promised to Kierbedź to give him a promotion for every completed span. After the bridge was completed with eight spans total in it, Kierbedź was promoted to the rank of General, but actually when he started the construction he already had a rank of Podpolkovnik (i.e. lieutenant colonel).

The bridge was formally opened on November 12, 1850. Since it was close to Blagoveshchenskaya (Annunciation) Square, it was called Blagoveshchensky Bridge. In 1855 it was renamed Nikolayevsky Bridge in memory of Emperor Nicholas I. In 1918, after the revolution, it was renamed again, this time in memory of Pyotr Schmidt, a leader of the Sevastopol Uprising during the Russian Revolution of 1905.

In 2006 a reconstruction of the bridge began. Since it would be completely closed to traffic for over a year, a temporary bridge was constructed between September 2005 and May 2006. During the reconstruction all traffic, both pedestrian and motorized, moved across the temporary bridge. In May 2006 the Lieutenant Schmidt Bridge was closed to traffic, and the dismantling of the spans, and then, of bridge supports began. The reconstruction was completed on August 15, 2007, slightly over two years after work began. During reconstruction the deck was widened from 24 m to 37 m.

After reconstruction, the bridge was renamed Blagoveshchensky Bridge.

See also 
 List of bridges in Saint Petersburg

References

External links

 "Lieutenant Schmidt son" is preparing for an opening

Bridges in Saint Petersburg
Bridges completed in 1850
Cultural heritage monuments of regional significance in Saint Petersburg